Gangodavila South Grama Niladhari Division is a Grama Niladhari Division of the Sri Jayawardanapura Kotte Divisional Secretariat of Colombo District of Western Province, Sri Lanka. It has Grama Niladhari Division Code 526A.

Nugegoda are located within, nearby or associated with Gangodavila South.

Gangodavila South is a surrounded by the Navinna, Wijerama, Gangodavila South B, Gangodavila North, Pagoda East and Gangodavila East Grama Niladhari Divisions.

Demographics

Ethnicity 

The Gangodavila South Grama Niladhari Division has a Sinhalese majority (95.0%). In comparison, the Sri Jayawardanapura Kotte Divisional Secretariat (which contains the Gangodavila South Grama Niladhari Division) has a Sinhalese majority (84.8%)

Religion 

The Gangodavila South Grama Niladhari Division has a Buddhist majority (90.8%). In comparison, the Sri Jayawardanapura Kotte Divisional Secretariat (which contains the Gangodavila South Grama Niladhari Division) has a Buddhist majority (77.1%)

Gallery

References 

Grama Niladhari Divisions of Kotte Divisional Secretariat